Pleshinë is a village in Ferizaj Municipality, Kosovo. According to the Kosovo Agency of Statistics (KAS) estimate from the 2011 census, there were 4,506 people residing in Pleshinë, with Albanians and Ashkali constituting the majority of the population.

Notes

References 

Villages in Ferizaj